Isaac Charles Parker (October 15, 1838 – November 17, 1896), also known as “Hanging Judge” Parker, was an American politician and jurist. He served as a United States representative from Missouri and was appointed as the first United States district judge of the United States District Court for the Western District of Arkansas, which also had jurisdiction over Indian Territory.

Parker became known as the "Hanging Judge" of the American Old West, because he sentenced numerous convicts to death. In 21 years on the federal bench, Judge Parker tried 13,490 cases. In more than 8,500 of these cases, the defendant either pleaded guilty or was convicted at trial. Parker sentenced 160 people to death; 79 were executed. The other 81 either died while incarcerated, were pardoned, or had their sentences commuted.

Early life
Born in Ohio, Parker was the youngest son of Joseph Parker and his wife Jane Shannon. He was the great-nephew of Ohio Governor Wilson Shannon. He was raised on the family farm near Barnesville, Ohio. He attended Breeze Hill Primary School, followed by the Barnesville Classical Institute, a private school. He taught in a county primary school to pay for his secondary education. At 17, he began an apprenticeship in law, called "reading the law" with an established firm, and passed the Ohio bar exam in 1859 at the age of 21.

Parker moved to St. Joseph, Missouri between 1859 and 1861, where he joined his maternal uncle's law firm of Shannon and Branch. On December 12, 1861, Parker married Mary O'Toole, with whom he had sons Charles and James. By 1862, Parker had his own law firm. He represented clients in the municipal and country courts.

Political career

In April 1861, Parker ran as a Democrat for part-time position of city attorney for St. Joseph. He served three one-year terms, from April 1861 to 1863. When the American Civil War broke out four days after Parker took office, he enlisted in a pro-Union home guard unit, the 61st Missouri Emergency Regiment. He had reached the rank of corporal by the end of the war.

During the 1860s, Parker continued both his legal and political careers. In 1864, he formally split from the Democratic Party over conflicting opinions on slavery. He ran as a Republican for county prosecutor of the Ninth Missouri Judicial District. By the fall of 1864, he was serving as a member of the Electoral College and voted for re-election of Abraham Lincoln. In 1868, Parker won a six-year term as judge of the Twelfth Missouri Circuit.

Parker was nominated for Missouri's 7th congressional district on September 13, 1870, backed by the Radical faction of the Republican party. He resigned his judgeship and devoted his energy to his campaign. Parker won the election after his opponent withdrew two weeks prior to the vote. Parker was elected as a Republican to the United States House of Representatives of the 42nd and 43rd United States Congresses, serving from March 4, 1871, to March 3, 1875. He was the caucus nominee of his party for United States Senator in 1874.

The first session of the 42nd Congress convened on March 4, 1871. During his first term, Parker helped to secure pensions for veterans in his district and campaigned for a new federal building to be built in St. Joseph. He sponsored a failed bill designed to enfranchise women and allow them to hold public office in United States territories. He also sponsored legislation to organize the Indian Territory under a territorial government.

Parker was again elected to Missouri's 7th district in the forty-third Congress. A local paper wrote of him, "Missouri had no more trusted or influential representative in ... Congress during the past two years".

In his second term, Parker concentrated on Indian policy, including the fair treatment of the tribes residing in the Indian Territory. His speeches in support of the Bureau of Indian Affairs gained national attention.

In 1874, Parker was the caucus nominee of the Republican Party for a Missouri Senate seat. But, the political tide had shifted in Missouri; it seemed unlikely that the legislature would elect him to the Senate, so he sought a presidential appointment as judge for the Western District of Arkansas.

Federal judicial service

On May 26, 1874, President Grant nominated Parker as Chief Justice of the Utah Territory to replace James B. McKean. At his own request, Parker was instead nominated by President Ulysses S. Grant on March 18, 1875, to a seat on the United States District Court for the Western District of Arkansas. It had been vacated by Judge William Story, who resigned under threat of impeachment for allegations of corruption.

Parker was confirmed by the United States Senate on March 19, 1875, and received his commission the same day. He served in this position until his death in office, on November 17, 1896.

Parker arrived in Fort Smith on May 4, 1875, initially without his family. Parker's first session as the district judge was on May 10, 1875, with court prosecutor W. H. H. Clayton. Clayton served as the United States Attorney for the Western District of Arkansas for fourteen of Parker's twenty-one years on the court.

Also on May 10, Parker commissioned Bass Reeves as a Deputy US Marshal. Reeves became one of the first African American lawmen west of the Mississippi River.

In May 1875, Parker tried 18 men during his first session of court, all of whom were charged with murder; 15 were convicted in jury trials. Parker sentenced eight of them to a mandatory death penalty. He ordered six of the men to be executed at the same time on September 3, 1875. One of those sentenced to death was killed trying to escape. The governor commuted the sentence of another to life in prison due to his youth. In an interview with the St. Louis Republic on September 1, 1896, Parker said that he had no say in whether a convict was to be hanged due to compulsory death sentences, and that he favored "the abolition of capital punishment".

Parker's court had final jurisdiction over federal crimes in the Indian Territory from 1875 until 1889, as there was no court available for appeals. The Five Civilized Tribes and other Native American tribes in the Indian Territory had jurisdiction over their own citizens through their tribal legal systems and governments. Federal law in Indian Territory applied to non-Indian United States citizens.

According to Congress, the federal court for the Western District of Arkansas was to meet in four separate terms each year: in February, May, August, and November. The court had such a large caseload that the four terms ran together. Parker's court sat six days a week in order to ensure prosecuting as many cases as possible each term, and often up to ten hours each day. In 1883, Congress reduced the jurisdiction of the court, reassigning parts of the Indian Territory to federal courts in Texas and Kansas; however, the increasing number of European-American settlers moving into the Indian Territories still increased the court's workload.

From May 1, 1889, Congress made changes to allow appeals of capital convictions to the United States Supreme Court. Forty-four cases in which Parker imposed the death penalty were appealed to the Supreme Court. It overturned and ordered a re-trial for 30 of them.

While serving as a district judge in Fort Smith, Parker also served on the Fort Smith School Board. He was the first president of St. John's Hospital, established by the local St. John's Episcopal Church. (In the 21st century, the hospital is known as Sparks Health System).

In his time on the court, Parker presided over a number of high-profile cases, including the trial of Crawford Goldsby, known as "Cherokee Bill", and the "Oklahoma Boomer" case involving David L. Payne, a non-Indian who illegally settled on lands in the Indian Territory. In 1895, Parker heard two cases involving Crawford Goldsby (Cherokee Bill). In the first, Goldsby was charged with killing a bystander during a general-store robbery in 1894.

He was convicted in a case that lasted from February 26 to June 25, 1895, and Parker sentenced him to death. While awaiting execution, Goldsby attempted to escape prison and killed a prison guard. He was tried again and convicted in Parker's court; the judge sentenced him to death on December 2, 1895. Goldsby was hanged on March 17, 1896.

Later years

Keeping with continued settlement in the West, the Courts Act of 1889 established a federal court system in the Indian Territory. This decreased the span of jurisdiction of the Western District Court at Fort Smith.

Parker clashed with the Supreme Court on a number of occasions. In around two-thirds of cases appealed to the Supreme Court from his court, his rulings were upheld. In 1894, Parker gained national attention in a dispute with the Supreme Court over the case of Lafayette Hudson.

Hudson was convicted of assault with intent to kill and sentenced to four years' imprisonment. He appealed to the Supreme Court and was granted bail. Parker refused to release Hudson on the grounds that statute law did not provide the Supreme Court with the authority to demand Hudson's release.

In 1895, Congress passed a Courts Act that removed the remaining Indian Territory jurisdiction of the Western District, effective September 1, 1896.

Death and legacy 

When the August 1896 term began, Parker was at home, suffering from Bright's disease and too ill to preside over the court. The jurisdiction of the court over Indian Territory was ended on September 1, 1896. Reporters wanted to interview Parker about his career, but had to talk to him at his bedside. Parker died on November 17, 1896, of a number of health conditions, including heart degeneration and Bright's disease. His funeral in Fort Smith had the highest number of attendees up to that point. He is buried at the Fort Smith National Cemetery.

In 2019, the city of Fort Smith unveiled a statue of Parker representing law and order.

Representation in other media
 Charles Portis features Parker in his novel True Grit, which has twice been adapted as films of the same name. Parker is also a featured character in the sequel to the first film. He was portrayed by James Westerfield in the 1969 movie and by John McIntire in the sequel.  He was played by Jake Walker in the 2010 remake of True Grit. 
 Zeke Proctor, one of Parker's deputy marshals, is featured in Larry McMurtry's 1997 novel Zeke and Ned.
 Carlyle Mitchell was cast as Judge Parker in the 1961 episode "A Bullet for the D.A." on the television series Death Valley Days, hosted by Stanley Andrews. Carole Mathews played Belle Starr recently released from federal prison. In the story line, Belle unsuccessfully plots the revenge assassination of U.S. Attorney W.H.H. Clayton (Don Haggerty) during a Wild West show in Fort Smith.
 In the pilot episode of the TV series Hec Ramsey, the title character (a former United States Marshal) briefly discusses having ridden for Parker for several years.
 In the 1968 film Hang 'Em High, the character of Adam Fenton loosely resembles the person of Parker, who is known by the epithet "the hanging judge."
 In the Steve Earle song, "Tom Ames' Prayer," the narrator Ames is sentenced to death by Parker.

See also
 George Maledon, an American hangman aptly nicknamed "The Prince of Hangmen", who served in the federal court of Judge Isaac Parker
 Shannon Political Family

References

Books

External links

 National Park Service (National Historic Site) entry about Judge Isaac Parker
 
 Judge Isaac Parker reference on About.com 
 List of men executed at Fort Smith while Isaac Parker presided

1838 births
1896 deaths
19th-century American politicians
Ohio lawyers
Missouri state court judges
School board members in Arkansas
Judges of the United States District Court for the Western District of Arkansas
Pre-statehood history of Oklahoma
People from Barnesville, Ohio
Politicians from Fort Smith, Arkansas
People of Missouri in the American Civil War
Arkansas Republicans
United States federal judges appointed by Ulysses S. Grant
19th-century American judges
Missouri Democrats
Republican Party members of the United States House of Representatives from Missouri
1864 United States presidential electors
People of the American Old West
Burials at Fort Smith National Cemetery
Union Army non-commissioned officers